Kalyvia Myrtountion (Greek: Καλύβια Μυρτουντίων) is a village in the municipal unit of Vartholomio, Elis, Greece. In 2011 its population was 139. It is situated in a flat, rural area, on the right bank of the river Pineios, 4 km from the Ionian Sea. It is 1 km southeast of Vartholomio and 3 km west of Gastouni. In the local government reform under the Capodistrian Plan in 1997 it became a part of the municipality of Vartholomio. The patron saint of Kalyvia is Saint John Chrysostom.

Population

See also

List of settlements in Elis

References

External links
Kalyvia Myrtountiou at the GTP Travel Pages

Populated places in Elis
Vartholomio